The cross-country team relay is an event at the annual UCI Mountain Bike & Trials World Championships. It has been held since the 1999 championships.

Medalists

Medal table by country

References

 Other sources
 Results from the Union Cycliste Internationale's website.

Events at the UCI Mountain Bike & Trials World Championships
Mixed sports competitions